The European Association of Social Anthropologists (EASA) is an organization of scholars in the field of anthropology founded in 1989. EASA serves as a major professional organization for social anthropologists working in Europe. It is supported by the Wenner-Gren Foundation for Anthropological Research.

History 
EASA was founded in 1989 with 22 participants from 13 European countries and the United States in the Italian city Castelgandolfo. Among its founding members were the anthropologists Philippe Descola and Adam Kuper.

Aims 
EASA seeks to advance anthropology in Europe by organizing biennial conferences, by establishing special interest working groups, and by facilitating the development of its academic journal, Social Anthropology/Anthropologie Social (SA/AS).

Presidents 
 2017-2018: Valeria Siniscalchi
 2015-2016: Thomas Hylland Eriksen
 2013-2015: Noel B. Salazar
 2011-2012: Susana Narotzky
 2009-2010: Michal Buchowski

Conferences 
 1990, 1st EASA Conference: University of Coimbra, Portugal
 1992, 2nd EASA Conference: University of Prague, Czech Republic
 1994, 3rd EASA Conference: University of Oslo, Norway
 1996, 4th EASA Conference: Catalan Institute of Anthropology (ICA), Barcelona, Spain
 1998, 5th EASA Conference: Frobenius-Institute, Frankfurt, Germany
 2000, 6th EASA Conference: Jagiellonian University, Kraków, Poland
 2002, 7th EASA Conference: University of Copenhagen, Denmark
 2004, 8th EASA Conference: University of Vienna, Austria
 2006, 9th EASA Conference: University of Bristol, UK
 2008, 10th EASA Conference: University of Ljubljana, Slovenia
 2010, 11th EASA Conference: National University of Ireland, Maynooth, Ireland
 2012, 12th EASA Conference: Paris West University Nanterre La Défense, France
 2014, 13th EASA Conference: Tallinn University, Estonia
 2016, 14th EASA Conference: University of Milano-Bicocca, Italy
 2018, 15th EASA Conference: Stockholm University, Sweden

References

External links 
 European Association of Social Anthropologists

Anthropology-related professional associations